Lupus-TR-3b is an extrasolar planet orbiting the star Lupus-TR-3 (a K-type main sequence star approximately 8,950 light-years away in the constellation Lupus).  The planet was discovered in 2007 by personnel from the Center for Astrophysics  Harvard & Smithsonian observing at the Siding Spring Observatory in Australia, by the transit method.

The planet has four-fifths the mass of Jupiter, nine-tenths the radius, and has density of 1.4 g/cm3. This planet is a typical “Hot Jupiter” as it orbits at 0.0464 AU distance from the star, taking 3.9 days to orbit. It is currently the faintest ground-based detection of a transiting planet.

See also 

 Harvard-Smithsonian Center for Astrophysics

References

External links 

 

Lupus (constellation)
Transiting exoplanets
Hot Jupiters
Exoplanets discovered in 2007
Giant planets